The Puerto Rico Special Investigations Bureau (SIB,  (NIE)) is a division of the Department of Public Safety responsible for investigations relating to organized crime, prison gangs, terrorist groups, gaming and white collar crime, and fugitives. It was created by the Bureau of Special Investigations for the Commonwealth of Puerto Rico Act, Act No. 38 of 13 July 1978 of the Legislative Assembly of Puerto Rico.

See also
 Office of Special Investigations
 Special Branch

References

External links
 Negociado de Investigaciones Especiales 

Department of Justice of Puerto Rico
Law enforcement in Puerto Rico
Government agencies established in 1978
1978 establishments in Puerto Rico